Francis Armand Bland, CMG (24 August 18829 April 1967) was an Australian politician.

Life and career
Born in Sydney, Bland was educated at state schools at Greigs Flat, Peakhurst and Kogarah and then at the University of Sydney. He became a New South Wales public servant, and then a lecturer at the University of Sydney in 1913. In 1928 he became an adviser to the Premier of New South Wales, Thomas Bavin (Nationalist), and remained in that position during the second administration of Jack Lang (NSW Labor) and the beginning of the administration of Bertram Stevens (UAP). In 1935 he became a Professor of Public Administration, as well as an editor and author. In 1951, he was elected to the Australian House of Representatives as the Liberal member for the safe seat of Warringah, holding the seat until his retirement in 1961. Bland died in 1967.

Notes

Further sources

Liberal Party of Australia members of the Parliament of Australia
Members of the Australian House of Representatives for Warringah
Members of the Australian House of Representatives
Australian Companions of the Order of St Michael and St George
1882 births
1967 deaths
20th-century Australian politicians
Academic staff of the University of Sydney